Morena is a town in central India.

Morena or MORENA may also refer to:

Places
 Morena (Lok Sabha constituency), Madhya Pradesh
 Morena (Vidhan Sabha constituency), Madhya Pradesh
 Morena, San Diego, California, a neighborhood
 Morena district, Madhya Pradesh, India, encompassing the town of Morena
 Camp Morena, a United States Navy base in California
 Casal Morena (zone of Rome), the  nineteenth (XIX) zone of Rome

People
 Morena (surname), a list of people
 Morena (given name), a feminine form of Moreno
 Morena (Maltese singer) (born 1984), born Margerita Camilleri Fenech

Music
 Morena, a Spanish pasodoble
 "Morena" (song), a 2009 song by Romanian singer Antonia Iacobescu
 "Morena", a 1961 song by Digno García
 "Morena", a 1981 song by Gilberto Gil
 "Morena", a 2000 song by No Mercy
 "Morena", a song by Red Hurley

Political parties
 Movement for National Rectification (French: Mouvement de Redressement National, MORENA), a political party in Gabon
 Movement of National Restoration, political party that acted as a legal front for Colombian paramilitary groups in the 1980s
 Morena (political party) (Spanish: Movimiento Regeneración Nacional), a Mexican political party

Other uses
 Morena, an alternative form of Marzanna, a Slavic goddess of harvest and witchcraft
 Morena Dam, California, United States